The following films were shown at the 2008 Sundance Film Festival.

Documentary Competition
 An American Soldier
 American Teen
 Bigger, Stronger, Faster*
 Fields of Fuel
 Flow: For Love of Water
 Gonzo: The Life and Work of Dr. Hunter S. Thompson
 The Greatest Silence: Rape in the Congo
 I.O.U.S.A.
 Nerakhoon (The Betrayal)
 The Order of Myths
 Patti Smith: Dream of Life
 Roman Polanski: Wanted and Desired
 Secrecy
 Slingshot Hip Hop
 Traces of the Trade: A Story from the Deep North
 Trouble the Water

Dramatic Competition
 American Son
 Anywhere, U.S.A.
 Ballast
 Choke
 Downloading Nancy
 Frozen River
 Good Dick
 The Last Word
 The Mysteries of Pittsburgh
 North Starr
 Phoebe in Wonderland
 Pretty Bird
 Sleep Dealer
 Sugar
 Sunshine Cleaning
 The Wackness

World Cinema Documentary Competition
 Alone in Four Walls (Germany)
 The Art Star and the Sudanese Twins (New Zealand)
 Be Like Others (Canada, United Kingdom, U.S.A., Iran)
 A Complete History of My Sexual Failures (United Kingdom)
 Derek (United Kingdom)
 Dinner with the President (Pakistan)
 Durakovo: The Village of Fools (France)
 In Prison My Whole Life (United Kingdom)
 Man on Wire (United Kingdom)
 Puujee (Japan)
 Recycle (Jordan)
 Stranded: I've Come from a Plane that Crashed in the Mountains (France)
 Triage: Dr. James Orbinski's Humanitarian Dilemma (Canada)
 Up the Yangtze (Canada)
 The Women of Brukman (Canada)
 Yasukuni (Japan, China)

World Cinema Dramatic Competition
 Absurdistan (Germany, Azerbaijan)
 Blue Eyelids''' (Mexico)
 Captain Abu Raed (Jordan)
 The Drummer (Hong Kong, Taiwan, Germany)
 I Always Wanted to Be a Gangster (France)
 Just Another Love Story (Denmark)
 King of Ping Pong (Sweden)
 Máncora (Spain, Peru)
 Megane (Japan)
 Mermaid (Russia)
 Perro Come Perro (Colombia)
 Riprendimi (Italy)
 Strangers (Israel)
 Under the Bombs (Lebanon)
 The Wave (Germany)
 The Wind and the Water (Panama)

Premieres
 Assassination of a High School President Be Kind Rewind CSNY Déjà Vu The Deal Death in Love Diminished Capacity The Escapist The Great Buck Howard The Guitar Hamlet 2 Henry Poole is Here In Bruges Incendiary The Merry Gentleman A Raisin in the Sun Savage Grace Sleepwalking Smart People Towelhead Transsiberian U2 3D The Visitor What Just Happened The Year of Getting to Know Us The Yellow HandkerchiefSpectrum
 Anvil! The Story of Anvil The Black List Kicking It The Linguists Made in America Where in the World is Osama Bin Laden? Young@Heart August Baghead Birds of America Blind Date Bottle Shock Chronic Town Goliath A Good Day to Be Black and Sexy Love Comes Lately Momma's Man Quid Pro Quo RedPark City at Midnight
 Adventures of Power The Brøken Donkey Punch Funny Games George A. Romero's Diary of the Dead Hell Ride Otto; or, Up with Dead People TimecrimesSundance Collection
 Edward II The Living End''

New Frontier
Seven Intellectuals in Bamboo Forest, Parts 4 and 5
casting a glance
Eat, for This Is My Body
Fear(s) of the Dark
Half-Life
Reversion

References

Sundance 2008
2008 films

2008 in American cinema